Insanity Fight is a vertically scrolling shooter developed by Linel for the Amiga and originally published by Microdeal in 1987. An iOS version from the original programmer was released in 2014.

References

External links
 Insanity Fight at Lemon Amiga

1987 video games
Amiga games
IOS games
Vertically scrolling shooters
Video games developed in Switzerland